Jabal Iyal Yazid District is a district of the 'Amran Governorate, Yemen. As of 2003, the district had a population of 84,393 inhabitants.

References

Districts of 'Amran Governorate
Jabal Iyal Yazid District